Pizzo di Campello is a mountain of the Swiss Lepontine Alps, overlooking Faido in the canton of Ticino. It lies between the main Leventina valley and the valley of Blenio.

References

External links
 Pizzo di Campello on Hikr

Mountains of the Alps
Mountains of Switzerland
Mountains of Ticino
Lepontine Alps